Ultramicroscopy is an established peer-reviewed scientific journal in the field of electron microscopy. The journal editor-in-chief is Professor Angus Kirkland and it is published by Elsevier. It provides a forum for the publication of original research papers, invited reviews and rapid communications. The scope of Ultramicroscopy is to describe advances in instrumentation, methods and theory related to all modes of microscopical imaging, diffraction and spectroscopy in the life and physical sciences.

According to the Journal Citation Reports, Ultramicroscopy has a 2021 impact factor of 2.994.

Abstracting and indexing 
The journal is abstracted and indexed in:

See also 

 Electron microscope
 Electron backscatter diffraction
 Transmission electron microscopy
 Materials science

References

External links 

 

Monthly journals
English-language journals
Elsevier academic journals
Biology journals
Publications established in 1975